Inside the Vainshtein radius

with Planck length  and Planck mass 

the gravitational field  around a body of mass  is the same in a theory where the graviton mass  is zero and where it's very small because the helicity 0 degree of freedom becomes effective on distance scales .

See also

References 

Quantum gravity